Kim Won-Jin (Hangul:김원진, born 1 May 1992) is a South Korean judoka. He is a two-time World Championship bronze medalist and won a gold medal at the 2015 Asian Judo Championships. 

On 8 February 2016, after winning bronze at the Grand Slam Paris Kim reached world no.1 in the men's 60 kg world rankings, holding the top spot until the 2016 Summer Olympics where he was eliminated in the quarterfinals.

In 2021, Kim won the gold medal in his event at the 2021 Judo World Masters held in Doha, Qatar.

Competitive Record 

(as of 19 February 2016)

Palmarès

2009
 Asian U20 Championships −55 kg, Beirut
2010
 World Cup −60 kg, Rome
2011
 Summer Universiade −60 kg, Shenzhen
 World Cup −60 kg, Ulan Bator
2012
 Grand Slam −60 kg, Paris
 World Cup −60 kg, Ulan Bator
 World Cup −60 kg, Jeju
 East Asian Games −60 kg, Gochang
 World Cup −60 kg, Oberwart
2013
 Asian Championships −60 kg, Bangkok
 Summer Universiade Team event, Kazan
 Summer Universiade −60 kg, Kazan
 World Championships −60 kg, Rio de Janeiro

References

External links
 
 
 
 

Living people
1992 births
Asian Games medalists in judo
Judoka at the 2014 Asian Games
South Korean male judoka
Asian Games bronze medalists for South Korea
Judoka at the 2016 Summer Olympics
Olympic judoka of South Korea
Medalists at the 2014 Asian Games
Universiade medalists in judo
Universiade gold medalists for South Korea
Universiade bronze medalists for South Korea
Medalists at the 2011 Summer Universiade
Medalists at the 2013 Summer Universiade
Medalists at the 2015 Summer Universiade
Judoka at the 2020 Summer Olympics
20th-century South Korean people
21st-century South Korean people